Ritu Jaiswal (born 1 March 1977) is an Indian politician who is the State Spokesperson of Rashtriya Janata Dal. She had been the Mukhiya of Gram Panchayat Raj Singhwahini, Sonbarsha, Sitamarhi, Bihar.

Early life 
Ritu was born to Bhola Prashad Choudhary and Asha Jaiswal on 1 March 1977 in Hajipur, Bihar. She has studied Bachelors of Arts (Economics) from Vaishali Mahila College. She is also a trained Bharat Natyam and Kathak dancer.

Political career 
Ritu contested and won the election for the position of Mukhiya from Gram Panchayat Raj Singwahini in 2016. She won by a huge margin of 1784 votes more than the nearest rival in a constituency consisting of fourteen thousand residents. She joined Rashtriya Janata Dal and contested the 2020 Bihar election from Parihar constituency.

Awards and recognition 

She was conferred the "Uchh Shikshit Adarsh Yuva Sarpanch (Mukhiya) Puraskaar 2016" at the 7th Bharatiya Chhatra Sansad by the Maharashtra Institute of Technology (MIT) School of Government on 18 January 2017 in Pune.

She was conferred the Champions of Change (award) 2018 by the honourable Vice President of India Venkaiah Naidu at Vigyan Bhavan, New Delhi on 26 December 2018.

Her Gram Panchayat Singhwahini was conferred the National Panchayat Award "Deen Dayal Upadhayay Panchayat Sashaktikaran Puraskar - 2019" by the Ministry of Panchayati Raj, Government of India in New Delhi on 23 October 2019.

She was conferred the "Flame Leadership Award - 2019" by the Rural Marketing Association of India at the Taj Santacruz, Mumbai on 21 June 2019.

She was one of the speaker at the international conference on LPG: Catalyst of Social Change-2 organised by Research & Development Initiative Pvt. Ltd. in association with Ministry of Petroleum and Natural Gas, Government of India in Ranchi.

She represented Bihar as one of the speaker at SEE Talks held at Indian Institute of Technology, Mumbai on 16 June 2018.

She was one of the speaker at TED (conference) organised in Patna in the name TEDx Bankipore on the topic "Why unregistered rapes in rural India not considered as crime" on 29 July 2018.

She was among the eleven member committee sent by the Ministry of Panchayati Raj, Government of Bihar to the workshop organised jointly by National Institute of Rural Development, Government of India and Ministry of Panchayati Raj, Government of Uttar Pradesh in Lucknow on the topic "Economic Development and Social Transformation through Gram Panchayat Development Plan" on 24 and 25 September 2019.

She was among the nine panelists selected by the National Institute of Rural Development, Government of India at the consultation workshop for mainstreaming Gram Panchayat Development Plan (GPDP) through adoption of 100+ Panchayat Clusters for holistic Development on 6 August 2018.

She was one of the speaker at the Youth Ki Awaaz Summit – 2019 organized at the Dr. B.R Ambedkar International Center, New Delhi on 20 December 2019.

She was the keynote speaker at "Democracy Express" by the Indian School of Democracy when the yatra was in Delhi on 22 December 2019.

Personal life 
Ritu married Arun Kumar on 7 December 1996. Arun Kumar is a 1995 batch Indian Civil Service (Allied) officer who has served as the Director, Central Vigilance Commission. They have a son and a daughter.

References

External links 
 

Living people
People from Hajipur
Indian activists
People from Sitamarhi district
Women in Bihar politics
Bihari politicians
1977 births
Babasaheb Bhimrao Ambedkar Bihar University alumni